The Midland Uruguay Railway was the second most important of five rail lines in Uruguay's early rail history. The other four systems were the Central Uruguay Railway Co., the North Western of Uruguay, the Uruguay Northern, and the Uruguay East Coast Railway. The Midland Uruguay Railway Co., Ltd. was registered In London In 1887 with capital of $3,000,000.

The Midland opened on August 15, 1889 with the  line between Paso de los Toros and Salto. The branch from Algorta/Fray Bentos was opened in its entirety August 17, 1911. Another  from Piedra Sola were opened on April 10, 1913. In 1936, there were 22 steam locomotives, one railcar, 20 coaches and 484 goods wagons. It remained independent until 1949. The railway ran northward and westward.

References

External links
 

Midland
Railway lines opened in 1889
Defunct railway companies of Uruguay